Dong Chao (born 5 February 1988) is a Chinese fencer.

Career 
Dong represented China at the 2010 Asian Games which also marked his maiden appearance at the Asian Games. During the 2010 Asian Games, he claimed a bronze medal in the team épée event. He also clinched bronze medal at the 2013–14 Fencing World Cup.

He represented China at the 2020 Summer Olympics which also marked his debut appearance at the Olympics. During the 2020 Summer Olympics, he competed in the men's épée event.

References 

1988 births
Living people
Chinese male épée fencers
Fencers at the 2010 Asian Games
Fencers at the 2014 Asian Games
Fencers at the 2018 Asian Games
Asian Games silver medalists for China
Asian Games bronze medalists for China
Asian Games medalists in fencing
Medalists at the 2010 Asian Games
Medalists at the 2018 Asian Games
Asian Games competitors for China
Universiade medalists in fencing
Universiade gold medalists for China
Universiade silver medalists for China
Medalists at the 2013 Summer Universiade
Fencers at the 2020 Summer Olympics
Olympic fencers of China
Fencers from Beijing
21st-century Chinese people